Mata Prasad Pandey (born 31 December 1942) is an Indian politician and former Speaker of Uttar Pradesh Legislative Assembly for two terms. At present he is representing Itwa 305 constituency in Siddharthnagar of Uttar Pradesh.

Career
 Elected Member of the Legislative Assembly in 1980, 1985, 1989, 2002, 2007, 2012 and 2022
 Participated in several political movements and imprisoned several times for movement for upliftment of the poor and down trodden people of the society.
 He has been member of Assurance Committee, Petition Committee, Delegated Legislation Committee, Parliamentary Research, Reference and Studies Committee, Rules Committee, Question and Reference Committee, Business Advisory Committee, Privilege Committee and Public Accounts Committee of the Uttar Pradesh Legislative Assembly.
 Minister for Health in 1991 and Minister for Labour and Employment in 2003.
 Speaker, Uttar Pradesh Legislative Assembly 26.07.2004 to 18.05.2007

Conferences attended

 50th Commonwealth Parliamentary Conference (Quebec City/Toronto) Canada: 2004.        
 58th Commonwealth Parliamentary Conference Colombo, Sri Lanka: 2012

References

Speakers of the Uttar Pradesh Legislative Assembly
Living people
1942 births
Uttar Pradesh MLAs 2012–2017
Uttar Pradesh MLAs 1980–1985
Uttar Pradesh MLAs 1985–1989
Uttar Pradesh MLAs 1989–1991
Uttar Pradesh MLAs 2002–2007
Uttar Pradesh MLAs 2007–2012
State cabinet ministers of Uttar Pradesh
Samajwadi Party politicians
Janata Dal politicians
Janata Party politicians
People from Siddharthnagar district
Uttar Pradesh MLAs 2022–2027